Ladies & Gentlemen: The Best of George Michael is a DVD by George Michael released in 1999. It includes 23 music videos and an interview with Michael Parkinson as well as a  documentary profiling George Michael's career.

Track listing
 "Outside"
 "Fastlove"
 "Spinning the Wheel"
 "Freedom! '90"
 "Killer"
 "Papa Was a Rollin' Stone"
 "Too Funky"
 "Faith"
 "I Want Your Sex"
 "Jesus to a Child"
 "Waltz Away Dreaming" (with Toby Bourke)
 "Father Figure"
 "Don't Let the Sun Go Down on Me" (with Elton John)
 "Kissing a Fool"
 "I Knew You Were Waiting (For Me)" (with Aretha Franklin)
 "Somebody to Love" (Live) (with Queen)
 "Monkey"
 "One More Try"
 "Star People '97"
 "I Can't Make You Love Me" (Live from Unplugged)
 "A Different Corner"
 "You Have Been Loved" (Live from Unplugged)
 "Careless Whisper"
 Interview with Michael Parkinson
 Documentary about George Michael's career

Certifications

References

 

1999 video albums
George Michael albums